Princess Sophie of Saxe-Hildburghausen (Ernestine Friederike Sophie; 22 February 1760, Hildburghausen – 28 October 1776, Coburg), was a Princess of Saxe-Hildburghausen by birth, and by marriage she became the Hereditary Princess of Saxe-Coburg-Saalfeld.

Life 
Sophie was born on 22 February 1760. She was the daughter of Duke Ernest Frederick III of Saxe-Hildburghausen (1727–1780) and Princess Ernestine of Saxe-Weimar (1740–1786). Her godparents were the Danish royal couple, the King of Poland, and the Regents of the houses of Saxe-Coburg, Saxe-Weimar, Mecklenburg and Württemberg.

On 6 March 1776, Sophie married at the age of 16 (in Hildburghausen) the Hereditary Prince (and later Duke) Francis Frederick Anthony of Saxe-Coburg-Saalfeld.  At the time, Francis was already in love with his future wife Countess Augusta Reuss of Ebersdorf, but he was unable to break off his engagement with her.

Sophie died of influenza just seven months later, on 28 October 1776. She remained childless. She was buried in the crypt of the St. Moritz Church in Coburg.

Ancestry

References 

 Heinrich Ferdinand Schöppl: Die Herzoge von Sachsen-Altenburg, Bolzano, 1917, reprint Altenburg, 1992

House of Saxe-Hildburghausen
House of Wettin
1760 births
1776 deaths
Duchesses of Saxe-Coburg-Saalfeld
Princesses of Saxe-Hildburghausen
Daughters of monarchs